The Kiev class (officially designated as Project 48) was designed in 1939 for the Soviet Navy as a smaller class of destroyer leaders after the cancellation of the  ships that had been intended to be built in the Soviet Union. Only three ships were begun; one was cancelled and scrapped before the Axis invasion in mid-1941 and construction of the other two was suspended during the war. The navy considered completing them under a new Project 48-K configuration afterwards, but decided against that as they would have been competing against a more modern design that lacked the stability problems that the 48-K design would have had. The Soviets either scrapped them or used them as targets.

Background and description
Originally three more Tashkents were ordered to be built in the Soviet Union, but it proved to be too difficult to marry the Italian design with Soviet shipbuilding practices and they were cancelled. Instead, the Soviets designed the Kiev class to be a smaller version with much the same armament as the Tashkent class. The Soviet Navy envisioned building 13 Kiev class ships in 1937 during the Third Five-Year Plan and then proposed 30 ships in its shipbuilding proposal in August 1939, but the government decided to only build half that number, with twelve in the first part of the five-year plan and two in the latter part. Of these twelve ships, the first eight were ordered as part of the Third Five-Year Plan–three ships for the Black Sea Fleet and five for the Baltic Fleet–and the remaining four on 10 April 1941, split between the Black Sea and Northern Fleets. The remaining ships were intended to be ordered as part of the Fourth Five-Year Plan. Only three of these ships were laid down, all in 1939. On 19 October 1940, the government reevaluated the shipbuilding program in light of the changing international situation and canceled all ships that had not yet been laid down. In addition, it ordered the one ship that had been started for the Baltic Fleet to be scrapped, and the pair being built for the Black Sea Fleet to be completed. A contributing factor in this decision may have been the Project 35 large-destroyer design scheduled for 1941 which was intended to have a dual-purpose main armament and much greater range.

Their crew numbered 264 officers and sailors.

Armament

The main armament of the Kiev-class ships consisted of six 50-caliber  B-13 guns in three twin-gun B-2-LM turrets, one superfiring pair forward of the superstructure and the other mount aft of it. The ships carried 900 rounds for their guns. Anti-aircraft defense was provided by a twin-gun 39-K mount for 55-caliber  34-K AA guns atop the rear superstructure. The 34-K guns could elevate between −5° and +85° and had a rate of fire of 15–20 rounds per minute. The ships were fitted with four twin-gun mounts for  DShK machine guns.

The ships carried ten  torpedo tubes in two rotating quintuple mounts amidships. The ships could also carry 86 Model 1926 mines and 30 depth charges–ten  BB-1s and twenty  BM-1s–which were delivered by two throwers.

Ships

In July 1941, the shipbuilding program was reevaluated in light of the Axis invasion the previous month and both Kiev and Erevan were to be continued. Advancing German forces forced the ships that had been launched at Nikolayev to be evacuated in August to ports on the eastern coast of the Black Sea. The two ships were towed to various ports before ending up in Batumi, Georgia, in January 1942. They were towed back to Nikolayev on 12 April 1945 to finish building. The navy wanted to modify the design to reflect the latest war experience and the shipyard proposed in 1947 a complete modernization with weapons and radars that were still being designed. The navy rejected this proposal and asked for a more realistic design the following year under Project 48-K.

It replaced the anti-aircraft armament with a twin-gun turret for the 55-caliber  52-K gun and eight water-cooled, V-11 twin-gun mounts for the 74-caliber  70-K AA guns. Depth-charge stowage was increased to 48 BM-1s and the torpedo tubes were replaced by the latest type. The stability of the proposal was so limited that the latest gunnery radar could not be fitted and the ships were competing for resources with the Project 30-bis s of a similar size already being built. Ultimately, the navy decided that it did not need a pair of unique ships with their own special maintenance and training requirements and canceled all further development in 1950.

Kiev was towed back to Nikolaev after the war and was expended as a target during gunnery exercises in October 1946. The ship was refloated the following year and was transferred to the Caspian Sea to serve as a target for guided-missile tests. Sometime after 1960, Kiev returned to the Black Sea where she was sunk in 1962 during the testing of P-6 anti-ship missiles (NATO codename: SS-N-3 Shaddock).

Erevan was used as a barracks ship after the war. She was transferred to the Caspian in 1953 to be used as a target for anti-ship missiles. The ship was sunk during these tests, but was subsequently refloated and broken up for scrap.

Notes

Citations

Bibliography

Further reading

Destroyer classes
Destroyers of the Soviet Navy
Proposed ships
Abandoned military projects of the Soviet Union